Manuel de Mercado Aldrete, O.S.H. (died 4 April 1580) was a Roman Catholic prelate who served as Bishop of Panamá (1576–1580) and Bishop of Puerto Rico (1570–1576).

Biography
Manuel de Mercado Aldrete was born in Spain and ordained a priest in the Order of Saint Jerome. On February September 4, 1570, Pope Pius V, appointed him Bishop of Puerto Rico. In 1571, he was consecrated bishop by Cristóbal Rojas Sandoval, Archbishop of Seville. On March 28, 1576, Pope Gregory XIII, appointed him Bishop of Panamá. He served as Bishop of Panamá until his death on 4 April 1580.

References

External links and additional sources
 (for Chronology of Bishops) 
 (for Chronology of Bishops) 
 (for Chronology of Bishops) 
 (for Chronology of Bishops) 

1580 deaths
Bishops appointed by Pope Pius V
Bishops appointed by Pope Gregory XIII
Hieronymite bishops
16th-century Roman Catholic bishops in Panama
16th-century Roman Catholic bishops in Puerto Rico
Roman Catholic bishops of Panamá